The Winter Olympics are a multi-sport event in winter sports organized by the International Olympic Committee (IOC) every four years. Selection of the host city is done at an IOC Session four to seven years prior to the tournament, in which the IOC members vote between candidate cities which have submitted bids. As of the selection of the 2018 Olympics, 23 games have been held in 20 cities in 11 countries. Bids have been made by 56 cities in 23 countries.

The bid process consists of two rounds. First, cities and national Olympic committees (NOCs) may show their interest and submit a preliminary bid, becoming applicant cities. Through analysis of the questionnaires, the IOC gave a weighted-average score to each city based on the scores obtained in each of the questionnaire's eleven themes: political and social support, general infrastructure, sports venues, Olympic Village, environment, accommodation, transport, security, past experience, finance, and legacy. IOC's Executive Committee then selects a short-list of candidate cities. The candidate cities are investigated by the IOC Evaluation Committee, who make an evaluation report. These submit a more extensive bid book and are subject to additional evaluation, which is presented to the IOC members. Voting occurs as an exhaustive ballot, which may occur through multiple rounds until a single city holds a majority of the votes. IOC members from a candidate NOC may not vote in any round while their country remains in the election.

The first games were not subject to bids and awarded to Chamonix as part of Paris' bid for the 1924 Summer Olympics. Originally the host country of the Summer Olympics had the right to host the Winter Olympics as well, if they could provide a suitable host. The 1940 Olympics were originally awarded to Sapporo, but it and the 1944 Winter Olympics were ultimately canceled due to the Second World War. The 1976 Olympics were awarded to Denver, but in a 1972 referendum, voters rejected the games, and for the only time a city awarded the Games rejected them. IOC then offered them to Whistler, but a change of government meant they were no longer interested. Salt Lake City offered to host the games, but IOC finally chose Innsbruck instead. From 1994, Winter Olympics were held between Summer Olympic years. Starting with the 2004 Olympics, only the highest-rated cities are short-listed for the final IOC vote.

Innsbruck, Lake Placid, and St. Moritz are the only cities to have hosted two games. Albertville, Grenoble, Nagano and Turin have never lost a bid. With six, Lake Placid has the most bids, followed by Cortina d'Ampezzo with five. Montreal and Jaca have both made four bids without any being successful. Helsinki, Minneapolis, Montreal and Munich have bid for both Summer and Winter Olympics; all but Minneapolis have succeeded at winning Summer bids, but none have held Winter Olympics. Canada and the United States have bid thirteen and twelve times respectively, with the US being awarded four and Canada two games. Other countries to host multiple games are France (3), Austria (2), Italy (2), Japan (2), Norway (2), and Switzerland (2). Sweden and Finland have bid eight and five times respectively, all unsuccessfully.

By year
The following is a list of bids for the Winter Olympics, sorted by year. It consists of the year the games were held or scheduled to be held, the date the decision was made, the city and country which issued the bid, the votes at the IOC Session for each voting round, and the ultimate host of the games. The bid listed first for each games is the one selected by the IOC, whether or not it ultimately hosted the games.

By city
The following is a list of bids submitted by city. It lists the national Olympic committee, the city, and the games for which failed and successful bid were submitted. A parenthesis indicates that the city was awarded the games without a bidding process. A dagger indicates that the city was awarded the games, but that they were ultimately not held in the city, either because the games were canceled or moved. An asterisk (*) indicates that the bid was not shortlisted. A double asterisk (**) indicates that the bid was withdrawn.

By country
The following is a list of bids submitted by national Olympic committee, listing the country and years it bid. Only countries that have submitted bids from multiple cities are included. Successful bids are in boldface. Parenthesis/Brackets indicates that the city was awarded the games without a bidding process. A dagger indicates that the city was awarded the games, but that they were ultimately not held in the city, either because the games were canceled or moved.

See also 
 Bids for Olympic Games
 List of bids for the Summer Olympics

References

 
Olympic Winter bids
Winter Olympics
Bids Winter